Harold A. McDonald (28 July 1925  – 13 May 2001) was an Australian rules footballer who played with Port Adelaide in the South Australian National Football League.

Notes

External links 

1925 births
2001 deaths
Australian rules footballers from South Australia
Port Adelaide Football Club players (all competitions)